EngineeringUK is an independent, not-for-profit organisation. Its stated purpose is to promote the contribution that engineers, and engineering and technology, make to society. Based in the United Kingdom, EngineeringUK intends to inspire people at all levels to pursue careers in engineering and technology.

Main programme of work 

EngineeringUK is the lead organiser of annual The Big Bang UK Young Scientists & Engineers Fair.

References

External links
 www.EngineeringUK.com

2001 establishments in the United Kingdom
Charities based in London
Engineering education in the United Kingdom
Engineering societies based in the United Kingdom
Organisations based in the City of London
Organizations established in 2001